Smooth as Satin is a 1925 American silent drama film based upon the stage play, The Chatterbox,  by Bayard Veiller. It was directed by Ralph Ince and stars Evelyn Brent. The film was remade in 1930, entitled Alias French Gertie.

Plot
As described in a film magazine review, Gertie Jones, known as the "perfect maid," finds herself unable to open her mistress' safe and finds Jimmy Hartigan is also in the house after the necklace. Police enter and Hartigan prevents the young woman from being arrested by sacrificing his own freedom. While in the penitentiary he marries Gertie. They decide to take the loot they have and invest it in business, but their friends scam them. To get their money back, they hold up the couple on the road. They are caught by the police, but are saved by Chicago Red, who has something on the detective. Gertie and Jimmy decide to return to the straight and narrow.

Cast
 Evelyn Brent as Gertie Jones
 Bruce Gordon as Jimmy Hartigan
 Fred Kelsey as Kersey
 Fred Esmelton as Bill Munson
 Mabel Van Buren as Mrs. Munson
 John Gough as Henderson

Preservation
With no prints of Smooth as Satin located in any film archives, it is a lost film.

References

External links

1925 films
1925 drama films
Silent American drama films
American silent feature films
American black-and-white films
Films directed by Ralph Ince
Lost American films
Film Booking Offices of America films
1925 lost films
Lost drama films
1920s American films